Friedrich Wilhelm Rediess (10 October 1900 – 8 May 1945) was the SS and police leader during the German occupation of Norway during the Second World War. He was also the commander of all SS troops stationed in occupied Norway, assuming command from 22 June 1940 to his death.

Life

Early life and career 

Rediess was born in Heinsberg, Prussia, German Empire, the son of a court employee. After school, Rediess became an electrician. In June 1918, he enlisted in the German army, serving as an infantryman until the end of the First World War in November 1918. 

He then worked as an electrician until he lost his job in the Great Depression.

In May 1925, Rediess joined the SA and in December 1925 was approved for membership in the Nazi Party. He led a Düsseldorf SA company in 1927 and was transferred to the SS with his unit in 1930. 

Promotion swiftly followed for Rediess, who achieved the rank of Gruppenführer (major general) in 1935. At one point, he served as the division commander of SS-Oberabschnitt Südost.

World War II 

At the onset of World War II, Rediess was responsible for implementing German racial laws in Prussia, overseeing the deportation of Jews from East Prussia. Rediess was then given the task of eradicating 1,558 Jewish deportees to be deemed mentally ill. 

Rediess borrowed "gas vans" and personnel from other SS units, offering a bounty of ten Reichsmark for each Jew killed. It took 19 days to accomplish these killings, and Rediess reneged on the payment.

Following the German invasion of Norway, Rediess was transferred there to work with Reichskommissar Josef Terboven. In March 1941, citing reports of large numbers of Norwegian women impregnated by German soldiers, Rediess implemented the German Lebensborn program in Norway. 

The program encouraged the production of "racially pure" Aryan children, who were usually sired by SS troops. Ultimately, 8,000 children were born under the auspices of the program, making Norway second only to Germany in registered Aryan births during the war.

Death
Rediess committed suicide by a self-inflicted gunshot wound upon the collapse of the Third Reich in Norway on 8 May 1945. His remains were destroyed the same day when Terboven killed himself by detonating fifty kilograms of dynamite in a bunker on the Skaugum compound.

Awards and decorations
Among his many decorations was the Honour Cross of the World War without Swords, the Danzig Cross, 1st Class, the NSDAP Long Service Award in Bronze (10 years) and Silver (15 years), the SS Long Service Award (10 years), the SS-Ehrendegen, the DRL/Reich Sports Badge (Deutsches Reichssportabzeichen) in Silver on 13 August 1937, the Rider's Badge, the SA Sports Badge in Gold, the SS-Ehrenring, the War Merit Cross (1939), 2nd and 1st Class with Swords (1st Class on 30 January 1942) and the Iron Cross (1939), 2nd Class on 11 November 1943.

See also
List SS-Obergruppenführer

References 

1900 births
1945 deaths
German Army personnel of World War I
Prussian Army personnel
German military personnel who committed suicide
Holocaust perpetrators
Nazi eugenics
People from the Rhine Province
SS and Police Leaders
Suicides by firearm in Norway
Sturmabteilung personnel
Members of the Reichstag of Nazi Germany
Nazis who committed suicide
Suicides by firearm
SS-Obergruppenführer
Nazi Party politicians
Norway in World War II
Suicides in Norway
1945 suicides